Henry Fowler may refer to:

 Henry the Fowler (861–936), Duke of Saxony and King of the Germans
 Henry Fowler (hymn writer) (1779–1838), English hymn writer
 Henry Fowler (Maryland and Wisconsin) (1799–?), American farmer and politician
 Henry J. Fowler, Maryland businessman and legislator 
 Henry Hartley Fowler, 1st Viscount Wolverhampton (1830–1911), British politician
 Henry Watson Fowler (1858–1933), English schoolmaster, lexicographer and commentator on the usage of English
 Henry Fowler (rugby), English rugby union footballer who played in the 1870s
 Henry Fowler (died 1896) of Milsom and Fowler, Victorian murderer
 Sir Henry Fowler (engineer), (1870–1938) English locomotive engineer
 Henry Fowler, 2nd Viscount Wolverhampton (1870–1943), son of Henry Hartley Fowler, 1st Viscount Wolverhampton
 Henry Weed Fowler (1878–1965), zoologist
 Henry H. Fowler (1908–2000), U.S. Secretary of the Treasury
 Henry Fowler (educator) (1915–2007), Jamaican educator and politician

See also
 Harry Fowler (disambiguation)